Carlos Sainz may refer to:

People
Carlos Sainz Sr. (born 1962), Spanish rally driver world champion, father of Jr.
Carlos Sainz Jr. (born 1994), Spanish Formula One driver, son of Sr.

Other uses
 Carlos Sainz: World Rally Championship, 1990 videogame

See also

 
 Sainz (surname)
 Carlos (disambiguation)